Amitava Kumar (born 17 March 1963) is an Indian writer and journalist who is Professor of English on the Helen D. Lockwood Chair at Vassar College.

Early life
Kumar was born in the city of Arrah in the Indian state of Bihar on 17 March 1963. He grew up close to his birthplace in Patna, also in Bihar. There he spent his formative years at St Michael's High School. In India, Kumar earned a bachelor's degree in political science from Hindu College, Delhi University in 1984. He holds two master's degrees in Linguistics and Literature from Delhi University (1986) and Syracuse University (1988) respectively. In 1993, he received his doctoral degree from the Department of Cultural Studies and Comparative Literature at the University of Minnesota. He lives with his family in Poughkeepsie, New York.

Work

Overview
Kumar is the author of Husband of a Fanatic (The New Press, 2005 and Penguin-India, 2004), Bombay-London-New York (Routledge and Penguin-India, 2002), Passport Photos (University of California Press and Penguin-India, 2000), the book of poems No Tears for the N.R.I. (Writers Workshop, Calcutta, 1996), the novel Home Products (Picador-India, 2007 and as Nobody Does the Right Thing in 2009).

His prize-winning book is A Foreigner Carrying in the Crook of His Arm a Tiny Bomb: A Writer’s Report on the Global War on Terror (Duke University Press, 2010; and as Evidence of Suspicion, 2009). In his review, Dwight Garner (critic) at the New York Times called it a "perceptive and soulful – if at times academic – meditation on the global war on terror and its cultural and human repercussions." It was also awarded the Best Non-Fiction Book of the Year in the Asian American Literary Awards.

Husband of a Fanatic was an "Editors' Choice" book at the New York Times; Bombay-London-New York was on the list of "Books of the Year" in New Statesman (UK); and Passport Photos won an "Outstanding Book of the Year" award from the Myers Program for the Study of Bigotry and Human Rights in North America. His novel Home Products was short-listed for India's premier literary prize, the Vodafone Crossword Book Award.

Kumar was the scriptwriter for two documentary films: Dirty Laundry – about the national-racial politics of Indian South Africans  – and Pure Chutney – about the descendants of indentured Indian labourers in Trinidad.

His academic writing and literary criticism has appeared in several journals, including Critical Inquiry, Critical Quarterly, College Literature, Race and Class, American Quarterly, Rethinking Marxism, Minnesota Review, Journal of Advanced Composition, Amerasia Journal and Modern Fiction Studies.

As a journalist, Kumar has regularly authored articles for newspapers and magazines across the world such as New Statesman, The Nation, The Caravan, The Indian Express and The Hindu. In 2008, on Al Jazeera's Riz Khan Show, Kumar was interviewed on the use of terror threats by governments to advance their own political agendas; the interview aired on the Al Jazeera English Network. In February 2011, Kumar interviewed Indian novelist Arundhati Roy for Guernica Magazine.

Kumar, Ruchir Joshi, Jeet Thayil and Hari Kunzru, were threatened with arrest for reading excerpts from Salman Rushdie's The Satanic Verses, which is banned in India, at the 2012 Jaipur Literature Festival. In March 2013, Kumar collaborated with Teju Cole on a text-with-photographs entitled "Who's Got the Address?"

Published works

Books
 No Tears for the N.R.I., Writers Workshop, 1996, a book of poems
 Passport Photos, University of California Press, 2000, multi-genre book on immigration and postcoloniality
 Bombay–London–New York, Routledge, 2002, literary memoir cum critical report on Indian fiction
 Husband of a Fanatic: A Personal Journey Through India, Pakistan, Love, and Hate, The New Press, 2005, book on writing and religious violence
 Home Products (published in the U.S. under the title Nobody Does the Right Thing by Duke University Press, 2010)
 A Foreigner Carrying in the Crook of His Arm A Tiny Bomb, Duke University Press Books, 2010, a non-fiction book about the war on terror, and the literary as well as artistic responses to it.
 A Matter of Rats: A Short Biography of Patna, Duke University Press Books, 2014, 
 Lunch with a Bigot: The Writer in the World, Duke University Press Books, 2015, 
Immigrant, Montana, Knopf, 2018, first published in India as The Lovers, Aleph, 2017, 
Every Day I Write the Book: Notes on Style, Duke University Press Books, 2020, 
A Time Outside This Time, Penguin Random House, 2021, ISBN 9780593319017
The Blue Book: A Writer's Journal, HarperCollins India, 2022, a book of drawings and diary entries

Edited works
 Away: The Indian Writer as an Expatriate, edited volume of essays.
 World Bank Literature, edited volume of essays on global economies and literature.
 The Humour and the Pity, edited volume of essays on V.S. Naipaul.
 Poetics/Politics: Radical Aesthetics for the Classroom, edited volume of essays on radical aesthetics and pedagogy.
 Class Issues: Pedagogy, Cultural Studies, and the Public Sphere, edited volume of essays on radical teaching.

Forewords and introductory notes
 The Little Book of Terror, by Daisy Rockwell
 Where the Wild Frontiers Are, by Manan Ahmed.
 "Duty-Free Indians", a Foreword to Suburban Sahibs: Three Immigrant Families and their Passage from India to America by S. Mitra Kalita.
 "In Class", a Foreword to Class and Its Others, edited by J.K. Gibson-Graham.

Awards and fellowships
Most recently, Kumar has been awarded a Guggenheim Fellowship (2016).  He has also been awarded the Lannan Foundation Marfa Residency, residency at Yaddo, a Fiction Fellowship at the Norman Mailer Writers Colony, a Barach Fellowship at the Wesleyan Writers Festival, and has received awards from the South Asian Journalists Association for three consecutive years. In addition, he has been awarded research fellowships from the NEH, Yale University, Stony Brook University, Dartmouth College, and University of California-Riverside. A Foreigner Carrying in the Crook of His Arm a Tiny Bomb was also judged the Best Non-Fiction Book of the Year in the Asian American Literary Awards.

External links
 Official website
 New York Times review of Husband of a Fanatic
 Interview for the Wisconsin Book Festival, 2008
 Interview on blogsite "Between the Lines"
 Amitava Kumar's short story "Postmortem" on NPR
 WYNC interview on The Leonard Lopate Show, 2010
 WNYC interview on the Brian Lehrer Show, 2015
 Amitava Kumar on the PEN-Charlie Hebdo controversy
 Interview on Full Stop
 The Seen and the Unseen Podcast, 2022

References

1963 births
Living people
Hindu College, Delhi alumni
Syracuse University alumni
University of Minnesota College of Liberal Arts alumni
Indian emigrants to the United States
Vassar College faculty
American male writers of Indian descent
Modern School (New Delhi) alumni
Writers from Patna
Indian social sciences writers
21st-century Indian non-fiction writers